is a city in Saitama Prefecture, Japan.

Geography
Tsurugashima is located in the geographic center of Saitama Prefecture. Tsurugashima Station is approximately 40 minutes from Ikebukuro Station in Tokyo on the Tōbu Tōjō Line by direct express train. Tsurugashima is located at the tip of the Iruma Plateau, and the elevation is about 30 to 50 meters above sea level, gently descending from the southwest to the northeast.

Surrounding municipalities
 Saitama Prefecture
 Kawagoe
 Sakado
 Hidaka

Climate
Tsurugashima has a humid subtropical climate (Köppen Cfa) characterized by warm summers and cool winters with light to no snowfall.  The average annual temperature in Tsurugashima is 13.9 °C. The average annual rainfall is 1448 mm with September as the wettest month. The temperatures are highest on average in August, at around 25.6 °C, and lowest in January, at around 2.3 °C.

Demographics
Per Japanese census data, the population of Tsurugashima has recently plateaued after several decades of strong growth.

History
The area around Tsurugashima has been inhabited since prehistoric times, and a number of large burial mounds from the Kofun period are preserved within the city limits. During the Edo period, the area was largely under the control of Kawagoe Domain. The village of Tsurugashima was created within Koma District, Saitama with the establishment of the modern municipalities system on April 1, 1889. Koma District was abolished in 1896, becoming part of Iruma District.Tsurugashima was elevated to town status on April 1, 1966. The city of Tsurugashima was founded when the former town of Tsurugashima was elevated to city status on September 1, 1991.

Government
Tsurugashima has a mayor-council form of government with a directly elected mayor and a unicameral city council of 18 members. Tsurugashima contributes one member to the Saitama Prefectural Assembly. In terms of national politics, the city is part of Saitama 10th district of the lower house of the Diet of Japan.

Economy
Formerly an agricultural community, Tsurugashima has increasingly become a bedroom community, with over a third of its population commuting to the Tokyo metropolis or the city of Kawagoe.

Education
Tsurugashima has eight public elementary schools and five public middle schools operated by the city government, and one public high school operated by the Saitama Prefectural Board of Education.

Transportation

Railway
 Tōbu Railway - Tōbu Tōjō Line
 
 Tōbu Railway - Tōbu Ogose Line

Highway
  – Ken-Ō Tsurugashima Interchange, Tsurugashima Junction
  – Tsurugashima Interchange, Tsurugashima Junction

Bus

 Tsuru Bus community bus service
 Tsuru Wagon community minibus service

Local attractions

 Zennōji Temple
Wakaba Walk Shopping Centre

Notable people from Tsurugashima
 Aria Jasuru Hasegawa, footballer
 Jin Katagiri, comedian and member of the Rahmens duo
 Ryuji Kawai, footballer
 Atsuko Sakurai, actress
 Hideaki Takeda, footballer
 Jun Uruno, footballer
 Haruka Shimazaki, actress and former AKB48 member

References

External links

Official Website 

Cities in Saitama Prefecture
Tsurugashima, Saitama